U.S. Route 60 (US 60) in the Commonwealth of Virginia runs  west to east through the central part of the state, generally close to and paralleling the Interstate 64 corridor, except for the crossing of the Blue Ridge Mountains, and in the South Hampton Roads area.

Between Lexington in the Shenandoah Valley and Richmond, I-64 uses a lower elevation crossing of the Blue Ridge Mountains located about  further north, where it runs parallel to U.S. Route 250 through Rockfish Gap. In contrast, through this section, the older US 60 is mostly a rural two-lane road. With the crossing of the Blue Ridge Mountains at Humphreys Gap at a higher altitude in more rugged terrain, US 60 in this area offers much more challenging and weather-sensitive driving conditions, as well as a history of many crashes in the years before I-64 was completed. (The original US 60 alignment through Glasgow, now US 501, is lower than either but much curvier than I-64.)

East of north–south U.S. Route 29 (which runs parallel to the eastern slope of the Blue Ridge), the older US 60 and I-64 gradually converge as they pass through the rolling hills of the rocky Piedmont region in an easterly direction to reach the Fall Line at Richmond, where they again become very close.

From Richmond east to the harbor area near the mouth of Hampton Roads, US 60 again essentially parallels I-64 through Williamsburg and the Historic Triangle region, extending down the Virginia Peninsula east to the Hampton Roads Bridge-Tunnel. A few miles south of the bridge-tunnel, in Norfolk, US 60 diverges to follow the south shoreline of the Chesapeake Bay through Ocean View and past the south entrance to the Chesapeake Bay Bridge-Tunnel to reach Cape Henry. There it curves south to run along the Atlantic Ocean shoreline to end near the south end of the Virginia Beach resort strip.

The first developed portions of US 60 in Virginia included the Manchester Turnpike, later known as the Midlothian Turnpike, west from Richmond and the James River and Kanawha Turnpike west of Lexington into West Virginia.

Route description

In Virginia, as a through-route, U.S. 60 was largely replaced by Interstate 64. The latter is roughly parallel, although there is a separation of over 30  miles north and south between Lexington and Richmond.

In South Hampton Roads, the roads also separate. I-64 became part of the circumferential Hampton Roads Beltway and looping far south and west of Norfolk, rather than reaching the Atlantic Ocean. Although older, Route 60 continues its west to east travel, becoming the public roadway actually closest to the waters of the Chesapeake Bay and the Atlantic Ocean terminating near the traditional resort strip at Virginia Beach.

West Virginia to Lexington
U.S. Route 60 enters the state as part of I-64 near the top of the Eastern Continental Divide in the Appalachian Mountains and crosses the portions of the Great Valley, passing the city of Covington, and town of Clifton Forge and the city of Lexington.

Blue Ridge Mountains to Richmond
At Lexington, the newer Interstate route swings north, concurrent with I-81 to Staunton where it again turns east. The variation between the routes was largely due to terrain for the crossing of the Blue Ridge Mountains. U.S. 60 crosses at White's Gap; I-64 uses Rockfish Gap. East of the Blue Ridge, the two pathways gradually converge, meeting again at Richmond.

Although US 60 offers a bucolic interlude for many motorists in comparison with I-64, the western portion of the Lexington-Richmond section of US 60 can be very difficult to drive, especially for larger vehicles such as motor homes and commercial vehicles, or any vehicles during inclement weather. It was notorious for deadly crashes in the years before I-64 was completed.

I-64 via Rockfish Gap, Charlottesville
The newer I-64 uses Rockfish Gap, a lower elevation wind gap which was also selected for a vital railroad crossing by Virginia's legendary 19th century state engineer, Claudius Crozet. Even that crossing, at Afton Mountain, can be very treacherous, and has been particularly notorious for accidents during reduced periods of visibility, motivating the state to install an innovative pavement lighting system. East of the mountain, I-64 passes Charlottesville and has easy grades on its way to Richmond.

Older route via Buena Vista, Amherst, Cumberland

From Lexington, US 60 runs easterly across the Blue Ridge Mountains. The switchbacks and grades along the crossing of the Blue Ridge Mountains still used by U.S. 60 combine to form a very hilly and treacherous section. A short distance east of Interstate 81, as it passes through Buena Vista, even before leaving the city limits, the roadway immediately begins a steep climb. The roadway has many switchbacks and on both the eastern and western slopes, with White's Gap at the peak. After descending on the eastern side, travelers reach Amherst, where Route 60 intersects north–south U.S. Route 29.

Continuing east, there is an additional shorter section of mountainous terrain before the road levels out somewhat into the rolling Piedmont region through the middle belt of the state. At Sprouse's Corner in Buckingham County, north–south U.S. Route 15 is crossed. This is the last major intersection until reaching the outskirts of Richmond.

The road is two lanes for most of its journey eastward from Lexington, but widens to four lanes in Powhatan Virginia. Crossing into Chesterfield County, it intersects State Route 288, a semi-circumferential expressway around the southwestern quadrant of Metropolitan Richmond and becoming Midlothian Turnpike.

Richmond
East of VA-288, Route 60 continues a few miles into the community of Midlothian. From this point east, the road becomes almost a continuous business district and widens to six lanes through the urban parts of Chesterfield County and the westernmost portion in the city of Richmond.

U.S. 60 in the Richmond area enters on Midlothian Turnpike. The road largely follows the path of the old Manchester Turnpike, built early in the 18th century. Nearby, remnants of the Chesterfield Railroad, first in Virginia can be seen just south of the current highway. Midlothian was the site of coal mines after about 1700, with product transported overland to Manchester which was Richmond's sister city south of the river (until they merged in 1910). At Manchester, ships could dock in the navigable waters of the James River just east of the fall line.

U.S. Route 60 crosses the James River on the Manchester Bridge into downtown Richmond. Nearby in Richmond, it crosses U.S. Route 360, technically a spur. From Richmond, U.S. 360 extends southwest to Danville, Virginia just north of the North Carolina border and northeast to Reedville, Virginia on the Chesapeake Bay.

Rt. 60 leaves the Church Hill section of Richmond on Government Road and the Williamsburg Road, which follows the old Richmond-Williamsburg Stage Road for some distance in Henrico County. This area was the scene of several major American Civil War battles during the Peninsula Campaign in 1862, and the roadway borders federal cemeteries at Government Road near the city limits and at Seven Pines. There Nine Mile Road brings State Route 33 to the intersection.

Richmond to Hampton Roads
East of downtown Richmond, US 60 again parallels I-64 east along the Virginia Peninsula through the much flatter coastal plains of the Tidewater region of Virginia to reach the harbor at Hampton Roads. Most of the route immediately east of Richmond is two laned. In the years before I-64 was built, a hilly three-laned portion of US 60 in eastern Henrico County east of Seven Pines (and the junction of much newer I-295) was infamous for many years for its center "suicide lane". Most of this section is now two-laned, with the center lane area reserved for turning lanes.

East of Bottoms Bridge, in New Kent County and western James City County, US 60 is a lightly traveled four-lane divided highway that is sometimes used as an alternate route to Interstate 64 when the latter becomes congested. Near Anderson's Corner at the junction of Virginia State Route 30 (near I-64 at exit 227), US 60 swings somewhat south to pass through Toano and Norge to reach Williamsburg, which I-64 bypasses slightly to the north. (First designated through the area in the late 1920s, US 60 also has a shorter bypass of the Historic District which encompasses most Colonial Williamsburg attractions). At Williamsburg, the National Park Service's Colonial Parkway leads to both Jamestown and Yorktown.

At milepost 238 on I-64, Virginia State Route 143 begins. As Colonial Williamsburg opened, this four-laned route was built in the 1930s as Merrimack Trail to supplement US Route 60. It parallels both US 60 and I-64 all the way east through Williamsburg, James City, and York counties, and through Newport News to reach Fort Monroe (near the Hampton Roads Bridge-Tunnel) in Hampton.

East of Williamsburg, US 60 passes the multiple Anheuser Busch developments in James City County, which include an office park, the Kingsmill Resort, its Williamsburg brewery, and the Busch Gardens Williamsburg theme park. East of there, US 60 narrows again to two lanes, passing through the historic Grove Community and past Carter's Grove Plantation in southeastern James City County.

Newport News

Warwick Boulevard, once a major through traffic route, and now mostly a local connector road, is largely paralleled by newer highways, Interstate 64 and State Route 143 (Jefferson Avenue). These, with more lanes and higher speed limits, in combination with Warwick Boulevard, form the major east–west highways through modern-day Newport News.

The road was named for the former Warwick County, Virginia, one of the original eight shires of Virginia which consolidated with the City of Newport News in 1958 and assumed the better-known name. Warwick County was named in 1634 for Robert Rich (1587–1658), second Earl of Warwick and a prominent member of the Virginia Company of London, the proprietary venture which founded Jamestown in 1607. The western reaches of Warwick Boulevard transverse the Denbigh area, long the county seat of Warwick County.

A notable section of Huntington Ave carries US 60 in both directions overlapping, and is possibly the only example of a highway in the United States with such a configuration.

Notable sites along Warwick Boulevard or close by, west to east, include:
Lee Hall (several attractions)
Fort Eustis
Warwick Line
Old Warwick Courthouse (Denbigh)
Christopher Newport University
Ferguson Center for the Performing Arts
Riverside Regional Medical Center
Mariners' Museum and Park
Hilton Village
Huntington Park
Newport News Shipbuilding
CSX coal piers

Several miles east of Lee Hall, the road widens to four lanes near the entrance to Fort Eustis. In the early 21st century, Newport News was in the midst of a widening project to expand portions of Warwick Boulevard to six lanes. Another project in Newport News to relocate and widen the portion of Route 60 west of Fort Eustis and construct a new crossing of Skiffe's Creek is in a planning stage.

Route 60 follows 25th Street out of downtown Newport News into the city of Hampton.

Hampton

When it enters Hampton, 25th Street becomes Kecoughtan Road and Route 60 follows it to downtown. It runs through the Wythe and Southhampton neighborhoods, forming the northern boundary of the Olde Wythe Historic District. In the 1940s and 50s Kecoughtan Road was one of Hampton and Newport News's primary commercial centers.

It then turns onto Settlers' Landing Road and follows it through downtown Hampton and across Hampton River on the Booker T. Washington Bridge to join Interstate 64 in crossing Hampton Roads in the Hampton Roads Bridge Tunnel. (As a historical note, prior to 1957, when the bridge-tunnel was completed, the crossing was via a car ferry service. The bridge-tunnel was expanded to 4 lanes and tolls removed in the mid-1970s.)

Notable sites along US-60 in Hampton or close by, west to east, include:

 Old Wythe Historic District
 Little England Chapel
 Blackbeard's Point
 Historic Little England
 St. John's Episcopal Church
 Virginia Air and Space Center
 Hampton University
 Emancipation Oak
 Hampton National Cemetery
 Phoebus
 Fort Monroe

South Hampton Roads: a shoreline route to Virginia Beach

After passing the tip of Willoughby Spit and a bridge across the north shore of Willoughby Bay, back on land, US 60 exits I-64. The Interstate continues southerly into Norfolk as part of the Hampton Roads Beltway, and in conjunction with Interstate 264, generally offers the fastest way to reach the oceanfront area of Virginia Beach. 
  
However, US 60 offers a more scenic, if perhaps slower, alternative, by sticking to the shoreline of the bay and ocean to reach the same destination.  After leaving I-64, US 60 shifts onto Ocean View Avenue, a four lane boulevard following the southern shoreline of the Chesapeake Bay, going through the Ocean View area of Norfolk.

At East Ocean View, then roadway swings away from the bay front and becomes Shore Drive, passing the entrance to the Naval Amphibious Base Little Creek at Little Creek, Virginia as it heads east into the city of Virginia Beach. After passing the Navy Base, Shore Drive again runs close to the bay front and crosses US 13 near the southern terminus of the Chesapeake Bay Bridge-Tunnel. US 60 continues as a 4-lane divided highway as it crosses over Lynnhaven Inlet on the Lesner Bridge and towards the First Landing State Park and Joint Expeditionary Base East at Cape Henry.  At the end of the state park, the roadway briefly is called 83rd Street as it curves onto Atlantic Avenue, running parallel to the oceanfront from a few hundred feet to a block or so to the west passing through most of the most developed portion of the Oceanfront area of the resort city.

From Joint Expeditionary Base East to the terminus, the routing of US 60 is geographically north–south although it is signed as an east–west route (except for one sign where Atlantic Avenue meets Pacific Avenue noting US 60 as a north–south route). When Atlantic Avenue meets Pacific Avenue, US 60 continues straight onto Pacific Avenue, through the entire resort strip, passing 22nd and 21st streets, which lead to and from the eastern terminus of both the former Virginia Beach-Norfolk Expressway (now I-264) respectively, continuing to meet the original Virginia Beach Boulevard at 17th Street. It then continues along Pacific over the Rudee Inlet Bridge to the highway's eastern terminus at the intersection of Harbour Point and Rudee Point Road in Virginia Beach. The road itself continues southwest back into the city as General Booth Boulevard.

History

The Manchester Turnpike was a turnpike road in Chesterfield County, and was the first lengthy paved roadway in that state. It stretched from Manchester (now part of Richmond's Southside) west to Falling Creek near Midlothian, and is now known as Midlothian Turnpike, mostly forming part of US 60. In 1802, Chesterfield County's coal manufacturers and residents petitioned the Virginia General Assembly for permission to construct a turnpike between the port of Manchester and Falling Creek. The improved road was opened to travelers in 1804, and ran from Manchester along the old Buckingham road to Falling Creek, now the bridge on Old Buckingham Road west of Unison Drive.

Major intersections

References

External links

Virginia Highways Project: US 60

60
 Virginia
U.S. Route 060
U.S. Route 60
U.S. Route 060
U.S. Route 060
U.S. Route 060
U.S. Route 060
U.S. Route 060
U.S. Route 060
U.S. Route 060
U.S. Route 060
U.S. Route 060
U.S. Route 060
U.S. Route 060
U.S. Route 060
U.S. Route 060
U.S. Route 060
U.S. Route 060
U.S. Route 060
U.S. Route 060
U.S. Route 060
U.S. Route 060
U.S. Route 060